Ben Davison (born July 24, 1996) is an American rower. He competed in the men's eight event at the 2020 Summer Olympics.

References

External links
 
 Washington Huskies bio

1996 births
Living people
American male rowers
Olympic rowers of the United States
Rowers at the 2020 Summer Olympics
Sportspeople from Durham, England
Washington Huskies men's rowers